Fjölnir is a legendary king in Norse mythology said to have been the son of Freyr (Frey) and his consort Gerðr (Gertha). The name appears in a variety of forms, including Fiolnir, Fjölner, Fjolner, and Fjolne. He was claimed as the progenitor of the Swedish Yngling dynasty, reigning from Gamla Uppsala. According to the Grottasöngr, Fjölnir lived from the 1st century BC to the early 1st century AD.

Fjölnir was said to have drowned in a vat of mead while visiting Peace-Fróði, a similarly-legendary king of Zealand, the Danish island. Fjölnir was then succeeded by his son Sveigðir.

Name 
The etymology of the Old Norse name Fjǫlnir is unclear. It could stem from the verb fela ('to hide'), with Fjǫlnir as 'the concealer [of the mead of poetry]', or it may have emerged as an abbreviation of fjǫlviðr ('the very wise'). A derivation from fjǫl ('crowd') has also been proposed, with Fjǫlnir as the 'manifold' or the 'multiplier', although such an adverbial formation has no attested parallel. According to Lindow, the second etymology may be more fitting for a name of Odin, but the meaning remains uncertain in any case.

Fjölnir is indeed also frequently mentioned as a name of Odin. In Grímnismál ('The Lay of Grímnir'), Odin mentions it to Geirröðr as one of his many names that constitute the beginning of his epiphany. In Reginsmál ('The Lay of Reginn'), a man who is clearly Odin uses Fjölnir to refer to himself as he is standing on a mountain addressing Sigurd and Regin. In Gylfaginning ('The Beguiling of Gylfi'), Fjölnir appears among the 12 names given for Alfödr, another name of Odin.

Attestations

Grottasöngr
Grottasöngr informs that Fjölnir was the contemporary of Caesar Augustus (63 BC – AD 14). He was a mighty king and the crops were bountiful and peace was maintained. At his time, King Fróði, the son of Friðleifr, ruled in Lejre in Zealand. Grottasöngr relates that when Fróði once visited Uppsala he brought two giantesses, Fenja and Menja:
Fróði konungr sótti heimboð í Svíþjóð til þess konungs, er Fjölnir er nefndr. Þá keypti hann ambáttir tvær, er hétu Fenja ok Menja. Þær váru miklar ok sterkar.
However, the two giantesses were to be his undoing (see Grottasöngr).

Ynglinga saga
The Ynglinga saga tells that Fjölnir was the son of Freyr himself and his wife Gerd, but he was the first of his house who was not to be deified.

Then Snorri tells that after Freyr's death, Fjölnir became the king of Sweden. However, he drowned in a vat of mead visiting Peace-Fróði (Friðfróði), the king of Zealand.

Ynglingatal
Snorri also quoted some lines of Ynglingatal, composed in the 9th century:

Translation: ‘The word of doom that fell upon Fjǫlnir was fulfilled where Fróði lived. And the windless wave of the spears of the bull [HORNS > BEER] was to destroy the prince.’

The Historia Norwegiæ provides a Latin summary of Ynglingatal, which precedes Snorri's quotation. It also informs that Fjölnir was the son of Freyr, the father of Svegder and that he drowned in a vat of mead:

The even earlier source Íslendingabók cites the line of descent in Ynglingatal and also gives Fjölnir as the successor of Freyr and the predecessor of Svegðir. In addition to this it summarizes that Fjölnir died at Friðfróði's (i.e. Peace-Fróði): iii Freyr. iiii Fjölnir. sá er dó at Friðfróða. v Svegðir:.

Gesta Danorum
In Gesta Danorum, Book 1, Frodi corresponds to Hadingus and Fjölnir to Hundingus, but the story is a little different. It relates how King Hundingus of Sweden believed a rumor that King Hadingus of Denmark had died and held his obsequies with ceremony, including an enormous vat of ale. Hundingus himself served the ale, but accidentally stumbled and fell into the vat, choked, and drowned. When word came to King Hadingus of this unfortunate death, King Hadingus publicly hanged himself (see Freyr).

Ballad of Veraldur
Dumézil (1973, Appendix I) cites a Faroese ballad recorded in 1840 about Odin and his son Veraldur. It is believed that this Veraldur is related to Fjölnir and Freyr, as per Snorri's statement that Freyr was veraldar goð ("god of the world").

In this ballad Veraldur sets off to Zealand to seek the king's daughter in marriage despite Odin's warnings. The king of Zealand dislikes Veraldur and tricks him into falling into a brewing vat in a "hall of stone" where Veraldur drowns. When Odin hears the news, he decides to die and go to Asgard where his followers will also be welcomed after death.

The tale is similar to that of the death of Fjölnir, son of Freyr, who accidentally fell into a vat of mead and drowned while paying a friendly visit to Fridfródi the ruler of Zealand.

Notes

Bibliography

See also
Ynglingatal
Ynglinga saga (part of the Heimskringla)
Historia Norvegiæ
Gróttasöngr
Gesta Danorum

External links 
Gimle: Hedniska ballader: Balladen om Oden och Veraldur (Frö) (Text of the ballad of Veraldur).

Mythological kings of Sweden
Demigods